The Tanzania Mainland Premier League is a top-level professional football league in Tanzania, administered by the Tanzania Football Federation.

History
This league was first organized in 1921 in Dar es Salaam and by 1929, it had six participants. In the 1930s, the league included street teams such as Arab Sports (Kariakoo) and New Strong Team (Kisutu), which were mostly composed of Arabs and Africans. The Sudanese community also had their own team, which joined the league in 1941.  

Other teams of this early era in league history included the Khalsas, an exclusively Sikh team, and the Ilala Staff, a team made up of Ilalan residents.

In 1942, clubs from public institutions such as the Government School, Post Office, Railways SC, King's African Rifles SC, Police SC, and Medical Department started to dominate the league. However, most teams were disbanded in the aftermath of World War II, with many European players ceasing their participation in the league, and their clubs, which included Gymkhana Club, Police Club, King's African Rifles, and Railways, eventually withdrawing. They were replaced, from the 1940s on, by African street teams such as Young Africans (Yanga) and Sunderland (known as Old Boys in 1942 and later to become Simba), as well as the Goan's Club manned by Goans, and the Agha Khan Club by Ismaili Khojas.

The Sudanese team broke up in the mid-1940s. 

From this period onwards, Yanga and Sunderland gradually became the most popular and strongest clubs in Dar es Salaam. Yanga, founded in 1938, entered the first division of the league soon afterwards and won four major cups in 1942. Sunderland joined the first division soon after Yanga, and won four important trophies in 1946.

By 1955, the Dar es Salaam league had 38 registered clubs. It became the "National League" by 1965, incorporating most of the major teams in Tanzania. The name was later changed to the "First Division Soccer League" and to the "Premier League" in 1997. Tanzania Breweries became the sponsor of the championship, after which the League was called the Tanzania Breweries League (TBL). The contract with Breweries was terminated in 2001 after a conflict with the Tanzania Football Association. In 2002, a contract was signed with the telecommunication company Vodacom, which lasted until 2009, after which they were re-signed the same year.

Competition format

Competition
The Tanzanian Premier League (TPL) follows a typical double round-robin format; each team playing the other twice, home and away. Winning earns three points, a draw earns a point for both teams, and a loss earns zero points.

Promotion & Relegation
The bottom two placed teams are automatically demoted to the Championship, and are replaced by the winners and runners-up from the Championship. The third and fourth worst ranked teams enter a play-off with the 3rd and 4th placed teams from the First Division.

International Competitions
As a member of CAF, teams based in Tanzania compete in the CAF Champions League and CAF Confederation Cup.

Recent positive performances by TPL clubs in continental competitions have seen Tanzania rise in the CAF 5-Year Ranking. As a result, more teams from the league have had the opportunity to compete on the continental stage.

CAF Champions League
The league champion qualifies for the CAF Champions League for the following season.

Starting in the 2021-22 season, the second placed team from the previous season also qualifies for the CAF CL.

CAF Confederation Cup
Since the 2015–16 season, the winner of the Tanzania FA Cup has qualified for the CAF Confederations Cup. This qualification place had previously been awarded only to the runner-up in the Premier League.

From the 2021-22 season onwards, the champions of the FA Cup and the third-placed team in the Premier League have also qualified for the tournament.

Clubs
Starting from the 2018–19 season, the league is composed of 20 teams, which was further lowered to 18 in 2020 and 16 in 2021.

Champions

Wins by year 
Previous champions are:

1965: Sunderland (Dar es Salaam)
1966: Sunderland (Dar es Salaam)
1967: Cosmopolitans S.C. (Dar es Salaam)
1968: Young Africans S.C. (Dar es Salaam)
1969: Young Africans S.C. (Dar es Salaam)
1970: Young Africans S.C. (Dar es Salaam)
1971: Young Africans S.C. (Dar es Salaam)
1972: Young Africans S.C. (Dar es Salaam)
1973: Simba S.C. (Dar es Salaam)
1974: Young Africans S.C. (Dar es Salaam)
1975: Mseto S.C. (Dar es Salaam)
1976: Simba S.C. (Dar es Salaam)
1977: Simba S.C. (Dar es Salaam)
1978: Simba S.C. (Dar es Salaam)
1979: Simba S.C. (Dar es Salaam)
1980: Simba S.C. (Dar es Salaam)
1981: Young Africans S.C. (Dar es Salaam)
1982: Pan African S.C. (Dar es Salaam)
1983: Young Africans S.C. (Dar es Salaam)
1984: KMKM (Zanzibar)
1985: Majimaji F.C. (Ruvuma)
1986: Majimaji F.C. (Ruvuma)
1987: Young Africans S.C. (Dar es Salaam)
1988: Coastal Union S.C. (Tanga)
1989: Malindi (Zanzibar)
1990: Pamba SC (Mwanza)
1991: Young Africans S.C. (Dar es Salaam)
1992: Malindi S.C. (Zanzibar)
1993: Simba S.C. (Dar es Salaam)
1994: Simba S.C. (Dar es Salaam)
1995: Simba S.C. (Dar es Salaam)
1996: Young Africans S.C. (Dar es Salaam)
1997: Young Africans S.C. (Dar es Salaam)
1998: Majimaji F.C. (Ruvuma)
1999: Prisons (Mbeya)
2000: Young Africans S.C. (Dar Es Salaam)
2001: Simba S.C. (Dar es Salaam)
2002: Simba S.C. (Dar es Salaam)
2003: Simba S.C. (Dar es Salaam)
2004: Simba S.C. (Dar es Salaam)
2005: Young Africans S.C. (Dar es Salaam)
2006: Young Africans S.C. (Dar es Salaam)
2007: Simba S.C. (Dar es Salaam) [mini-league]
2007–08: Young Africans S.C. (Dar es Salaam)
2008–09: Young Africans S.C. (Dar es Salaam)
2009–10: Simba S.C. (Dar es Salaam)
2010–11: Young Africans S.C. (Dar es Salaam)
2011–12: Simba S.C. (Dar es Salaam)
2012–13: Young Africans S.C. (Dar es Salaam)
2013–14: Azam F.C. (Dar es Salaam)
2014–15: Young Africans S.C. (Dar es Salaam)
2015–16: Young Africans S.C. (Dar es Salaam)
2016–17: Young Africans S.C. (Dar es Salaam)
2017–18: Simba S.C. (Dar es Salaam)
2018–19: Simba S.C. (Dar es Salaam)
2019–20: Simba S.C. (Dar es Salaam)
2020–21: Simba S.C. (Dar es Salaam)
2021–22: Young Africans S.C. (Dar es Salaam)

Top scorers

Hat-tricks

 4 Player scored 4 goals
 5 Player scored 5 goals

References

External links
tff.or.tz; League website at association's website
Page at fifa.com; League standings & results
RSSSF competition history

 
Football leagues in Tanzania
Tanzania
Sports leagues established in 1965
1965 establishments in Tanzania